Intragenic may refer to:

Intragenic, a proposed designation for genetic modifications which originate in a common genome
Intragenic region, a term from which intron is derived